Tchagnirou Abdoul Djalilou Ouorou (born 18 July 1997) is a Beninese footballer who plays as a left back for Buffles du Borgou and the Benin national football team.

References

1997 births
Living people
Beninese footballers
Benin international footballers
People from Djougou
Association football fullbacks
AS Dragons FC de l'Ouémé players
ASPAC FC players
JA Cotonou players
Buffles du Borgou FC players